Hubert White may refer to:

Hubie White (born 1940), basketball player
Hubert White (store), menswear store in Minneapolis's IDS Center

See also
Bert White (disambiguation)
Hubert Wyndeatt-Whyte